Ullanadu is a village located in Bharananganam panchayat, Pala , Kottayam district in the Indian state of Kerala. The village houses around 1000 families.</ref> Vazheparambil is the ancient family in this area.

Amenities
Ullanadu supports a primary health center, veterinary hospital, cooperative bank, post office, and library. The main religious institutions are SH Church, Mahadeva Temple, Shanthi Bhavan and SH UP School. 

Nadukani view tourist attraction is situated near Ullanadu.Vazheparambil is one of ancient family in ullanadu

Culture 
The main locations of Prithviraj starred Kangaroo were in and around Ullanadu. Other films also utilized the area's scenic beauty.

References

Villages in Kottayam district